The AVRO tournament was a famous chess tournament held in the Netherlands in 1938, sponsored by the Dutch broadcasting company AVRO. The event was a double round-robin tournament between the eight strongest players in the world. 

Paul Keres and Reuben Fine tied for first place, with Keres winning on tiebreak by virtue of his 1½-½ score in their individual games. 

The tournament was presented as one to provide a challenger to World Champion Alexander Alekhine, though it had no official status. In any event, World War II dashed any hopes of a championship match for years to come. However, when FIDE organised its 1948 match tournament for the world title after Alekhine's death in 1946, it invited the six surviving AVRO participants (Capablanca had also died), except Flohr who was replaced by Vasily Smyslov.

Schedule

The AVRO tournament was played from November 6 to November 27, 1938.  The players travelled from one city to another in the following order:

Crosstable

The longest game was a 68-move win of Fine over Alekhine.  The shortest game was a 19-move draw between Flohr and Fine. Of the 56 games played: White won seventeen, Black won seven, and thirty-two were drawn. The tiebreak method was the Sonneborn–Berger score.

Capablanca's health

Capablanca's play was satisfactory in the first half of the event (50%), but collapsed in the second half, when he lost three games. He had only lost 26 tournament games in 29 years. Hooper and Whyld say "he suffered a slight stroke". His wife Olga recalled that his high blood pressure nearly cost him his life: "A doctor screamed at me, 'How could you let him play?'" (at AVRO 1938). In a 1939 interview Capablanca attributed his performance to "very high blood pressure and related circulatory disorders". His doctor wrote that he had dangerously high blood pressure while he was treating him from 1940 until his death in 1942, and believed that it contributed to his death. The Cuban had been suffering from angina pectoris going into the tournament and it was the only tournament during his life wherein he lost more games than he won.

See also
Botvinnik versus Capablanca, AVRO 1938, A famous game from the 11th round.
Nottingham 1936 chess tournament
World chess championship

References

Sources
АВРО-турнир: Состязание сильнейших гроссмейстеров мира. Голландия, 1938 год / [Авт.-сост. Г. Г. Торадзе]. Москва: Галерия, 2006. 295 с .

External links
AVRO 1938
AVRO 1938 game collection on Chessgames.com

Chess competitions
Chess in the Netherlands
1938 in chess
1938 in Dutch sport